Andrea Desiree Lewis (born August 15, 1985) is a Canadian actress and singer known for her role as Hazel Aden in the long-running TV series Degrassi: The Next Generation.

Television and film
Lewis appeared with Diahann Carroll in the biopic The Natalie Cole Story. She also acted with Naomi Judd in A Holiday Romance, which was a television Christmas special. In 1998, she played Cassandra in Down in the Delta.

In 2001, she played Brigette in an episode of Soul Food: The Series on Showtime, returning in 2003 for one episode, playing Dana. She also began her role as Hazel Aden in Degrassi: The Next Generation.

In 2002, she played Hilary Duff's best friend Carla Hall in the made-for-television movie Cadet Kelly.

In 2003 and again in 2006, she was nominated in the category of Best Young Ensemble Performance in a TV Series (Comedy or Drama) for her role in Degrassi: The Next Generation at the Young Artist Awards.

In 2006, after five seasons, her character graduated and Lewis left Degrassi to "do something new".

In 2009, she appeared in the Nickelodeon's musical film Spectacular!. She played Robin, a member in a high school choir, Spectacular, broadcast on February 16, 2009.

In 2011, she played a minor role in the musical Hairspray which travelled around Canada.

In 2012, she started the entertainment company Jungle Wild Productions to produce diverse and original television, film, and digital content showcasing women, people of colour, and people in LGBT communities.

In 2013, she created and starred in her own web series called Black Actress, which can be seen on Issa Rae's YouTube channel. Black Actress includes candid confessionals by actresses such as Amber Riley, Garcell Beauvais, Jenifer Lewis, and Naturi Naughton, who share their experiences in the acting profession.

In 2016, she created and starred in the web series Beyond Complicated, which can be found on Lewis' YouTube Channel.

In 2023, she starred in the Hulu and Andscape-produced movie Three Ways.

Personal life
One of two children, Lewis is the daughter of Caribbean-born parents. Her mother is from Jamaica and her father is from St. Vincent. Lewis resides in Los Angeles.

She is a close friend of Christina Schmidt with whom she co-starred with in Degrassi. She is also good friends with her Spectacular! castmates Victoria Justice and Avan Jogia.

Lewis and her best friend, Shannon T. Boodram, started their own blog, Those Girls Are Wild, which includes comedic skits performed by the two.

On October 28, 2021, via Instagram, Lewis announced her marriage to music executive and producer Felix Howard.

Discography
On September 20, 2005, her first album, Float Away, was released in Canada only. On October 10, 2010, Lewis released a second album, 5-4-3-2-1 for free on her blog.

Albums

Singles

Filmography

References

External links

1985 births
Living people
21st-century Black Canadian women singers
21st-century Canadian actresses
Actresses from Ontario
Black Canadian actresses
Canadian child actresses
Canadian expatriate actresses in the United States
Canadian film actresses
Canadian musical theatre actresses
Canadian people of Jamaican descent
Canadian stage actresses
Canadian television actresses
Canadian women pop singers
People from Pickering, Ontario